The 2015 Suruga Bank Championship was the eighth edition of the Suruga Bank Championship, the club football match co-organized by the Japan Football Association, the football governing body of Japan, CONMEBOL, the football governing body of South America, and J. League, the professional football league of Japan, between the winners of the previous season's J. League Cup and Copa Sudamericana.

The match was contested between Japanese team Gamba Osaka, the 2014 J. League Cup winners, and Argentine team River Plate, the 2014 Copa Sudamericana winners. It was hosted by Gamba Osaka at the Osaka Expo '70 Stadium in Suita on 11 August 2015.

River Plate won the match 3–0 to win their third international club title in 2015, after the 2015 Recopa Sudamericana and the 2015 Copa Libertadores (where they played in the finals less than a week before), and also became the first South American team to win this competition since 2009.

Teams

Format
The Suruga Bank Championship was played as a single match, with the J. League Cup winner hosting the match. If the score was tied at the end of regulation, a penalty shoot-out was used to determine the winner (no extra time was played). A maximum of seven substitutions could be made during the match.

Match

References

External links
スルガ銀行チャンピオンシップ2015, Japan Football Association 
スルガ銀行チャンピオンシップ2015OSAKA, J. League 
Copa Suruga Bank, CONMEBOL.com 

2015
2015 in Japanese football
2015 in South American football
Gamba Osaka matches
Club Atlético River Plate matches
2015 in Argentine football
Sport in Osaka